is a Japanese singer. In 2020, at the age of 17, she made her debut with the digital single titled "Usseewa", which peaked at number 1 on Billboard Japan Hot 100, Oricon Digital Singles Chart, and the Oricon Streaming Chart. The song reached 100 million plays on Billboard Japan after 17 weeks from charting-in, which was the sixth fastest in history and the youngest for a solo singer. In 2022, her song, "New Genesis", was used as the theme song for the anime film One Piece Film: Red, and topped Apple Music's Global Top 100 charts.

She currently belongs to the artist management company Cloud Nine.

Life and music career

Early life and musical beginnings: 2014–2020 
Ado was born on October 24, 2002, in Tokyo, Japan.

In 2014, Ado took an interest in music after the video-sharing website Niconico was released on Nintendo 3DS. She began watching videos on the small screen of Nintendo 3DS, and was impressed by the cover singers on Niconico who sang without showing their faces.

Years later in 2017, Ado began singing as an utaite (an internet cover singer) on Niconico, after uploading a video of herself singing a cover of "Kimi no taion" on January 10, 2017. On Nippon TV she said that during the time she was an utaite singer, she covered her closet in soundproofing material that she bought online and recorded in it.

In 2019, she featured in Kujira's digital single "Kinmokusei", which was released on December 23, 2019. A couple months later, she featured as a vocalist in a digital single "Shikabanēze" by jon-YAKITORY, which was released on March 29, 2020. In May 2020, she participated in Pony Canyon's compilation album PALETTE4. She released two songs, "Call boy" by syudou and "Taema naku ai-iro" by Shishi Shishi, as digital releases.

Debut with "Usseewa": 2020–present 
On October 15, 2020, Ado announced that she would make her debut with Universal Music Japan. On October 23, the day before her 18th birthday, she released the digital single "Usseewa" written by Vocaloid producer syudou. The music video, released on her own YouTube channel, reached 5 million views by November 14. On December 10, 2020, "Usseewa" ranked number 1 on Spotify Viral 50 Japan. On December 24, she released her second single "Readymade" written by Vocaloid producer Surii, as a digital release.

By January 23, 2021, "Usseewa" had reached 40 million views on YouTube, and on February 3, 2021, it ranked number 1 on both Oricon Digital Singles Chart and Oricon Streaming Chart. On February 14, she released her third single, "Gira Gira", written by Vocaloid producer teniwoha, as a digital release. Four days later on February 18, the number of subscribers on her YouTube channel exceeded 1 million.

On March 15, 2021, "Usseewa" reached number one on the Billboard Japan Hot 100, and on March 20, the music video on YouTube reached 100 million views, 148 days after its release. On March 29, "Usseewa" reached 100 million plays on the Billboard JAPAN chart "Streaming Songs" after 17 weeks from charting-in, which was the sixth fastest in history and the youngest for a solo singer.

On April 27, 2021, Ado released her fifth Single "Odo" which is used by NHK's Show about Vocaloid producers.

On June 11, 2021, she was chosen as the second Japanese female Artist for "YouTube's Artist on the Rise". And on June 14, 2021, she released her sixth Single "Yoru no Pierrot".

On December 11, 2021, she won "Best New Asian Artist Japan" for Mnet "MAMA".

Ado provided the singing voice for the character Uta in the 2022 anime film One Piece Film: Red; the album Uta's Songs: One Piece Film Red, containing the vocal songs from the film was released on August 10, 2022. The film's theme song "New Genesis" topped Apple Music's Global Top 100 charts.

From December 2022 to January 2023, Ado's first nationwide live tour "Shinkiro" will be held for 10 performances in six different locations throughout Japan.

In October 2022, Ado signed with Geffen Records to release music in the United States alongside her current record deal with Virgin Music.

Discography

Albums

Studio albums

Soundtrack albums

Singles

As lead artist

Featured songs

Promotional singles

Other charted songs

Music videos

Awards and nominations

Notes

References

External links 

  – Universal Music Japan
  – Universal Music Japan

2002 births
21st-century Japanese women singers
Japanese women pop singers
Singers from Tokyo
Living people
Utaite
Virgin Records artists
Geffen Records artists
Child pop musicians